Sonja  Atanasijević (born in 1962) is a Serbian prose author and journalist, lives in Belgrade.

Published works

Novels 
 Oni su ostali, (They Remained) 1995.
 Crveni krug, (Red Circle) 1997, 2007.
 Bekstvo iz akvarijuma, (Escape from the Aquarium) 2003, 2005.
 Narandže za Božanu, (Oranges for Bozana) 2004, 2005.
 Ko je ubio Alfija, (Who Killed Alfi) 2009.
 Vazdušni ljudi, (Air People) 2013, 2014.
 Velika laž, (The Great Lie) 2016.
 Spavaj, zveri moja (Sleep, My Beast) 2020.

Story collections 
 Krilata tuga, (Winged Sadness) 2005.

Her novels Escape from the Aquarium and Oranges for Bozana won the prize Zlatni hit liber from Radio Television of Serbia. 
The novel Air People won the prize Branko Copic from Serbian Academy of Sciences and Arts.

References

External links 
 Svet kultura/ Izabrano pet kandidata za NIN-ovu nagradu
 SKC/Sonja Atanasijević: Vazdušni ljudi

1962 births
Living people
Writers from Belgrade
Serbian novelists
Serbian journalists
Serbian women poets
Serbian women novelists